Dominique Harris (born April 14, 1987) is a former American football defensive back. He played college football at Temple University and attended Howard D. Woodson High School in Washington, D.C. He has been a member of the Buffalo Bills, Tampa Bay Buccaneers and Hamilton Tiger-Cats.http://www.nfl.com/videos/nfl-videos/09000d5d819e2a09/Moats-recovers-fumble

Professional career
Harris was signed by the Buffalo Bills of the National Football League (NFL) on April 29, 2010 after going undrafted in the 2010 NFL Draft. He was released by the Bills on September 5, 2010. He signed with the NFL's Tampa Bay Buccaneers on December 22, 2010. Harris was released by the Buccaneers on September 3, 2011. He played for the Hamilton Tiger-Cats of the Canadian Football League (CFL) during the 2012 CFL season.

References

External links
Just Sports Stats
Temple Owls bio

Living people
1987 births
American football defensive backs
Canadian football defensive backs
African-American players of American football
African-American players of Canadian football
Temple Owls football players
Buffalo Bills players
Tampa Bay Buccaneers players
Hamilton Tiger-Cats players
Players of American football from Washington, D.C.
H. D. Woodson High School alumni
21st-century African-American sportspeople
20th-century African-American people